Pseudalcantarea is a genus of flowering plants belonging to the family Bromeliaceae. Its native range is Mexico to Central America. It was first described as the subgenus Pseudalcantarea of Tillandsia before being raised to a full genus in 2016.

Species:
Pseudalcantarea grandis 
Pseudalcantarea macropetala 
Pseudalcantarea viridiflora

References

Tillandsioideae
Bromeliaceae genera